L. C. Graves (October 8, 1918 – February 11, 1995) was an American police detective. He worked for the Dallas Police Department and wrestled the gun from nightclub owner, Jack Ruby after Ruby shot Lee Harvey Oswald, the assassin of John F. Kennedy.

Graves was born in Camp County, Texas, and served in the United States Army during World War II. Graves worked for the Dallas Police Department from 1949 to 1970. His job was involved with homicide and robberies. He was also the brother-in-law of police detective, Paul Bentley, who arrested Lee Harvey Oswald. Graves and fellow detective Jim Leavelle were assigned as bodyguards for Oswald. After Ruby shot Oswald, Graves wrestled the revolver from Ruby’s hand. Graves had a testimony before the Warren Commission from March 24, 1964, to April 17, 1964.

Graves died on February 11, 1995, of heart failure at the Presbyterian Hospital in Kaufman, Texas, at the age of 76. According to The New York Times, it was changed that he died from a surgery. Graves is buried in Grove Hill Cemetery.

References 

1918 births
1995 deaths
People from Camp County, Texas
American police detectives
Dallas Police Department officers
United States Army personnel of World War II
Military personnel from Texas
People associated with the assassination of John F. Kennedy
Burials in Massachusetts